Seddon may refer to:

People 
 Seddon (surname)

Places

Australia
  Hundred of Seddon, a cadastral unit in South Australia
 Seddon Conservation Park, a protected area in South Australia
 Seddon, South Australia, a locality
 Seddon, Victoria, a suburb

New Zealand 
 Seddon, New Zealand, a town
 Seddonville, a locality

Other uses 
 Seddon Atkinson, former British vehicle manufacturer